William Beckner (born September 15, 1941) is an American mathematician, known for his work in harmonic analysis, especially geometric inequalities. He is the Paul V. Montgomery Centennial Memorial Professor in Mathematics at The University of Texas at Austin.

Education
Beckner earned his Bachelor of Science in physics from the University of Missouri in Columbia, Missouri in 1963, where he became a member of the Phi Beta Kappa Society.  He later earned his Ph.D. in mathematics at Princeton University in Princeton, New Jersey, where his doctoral adviser was Elias Stein.  He also completed some postgraduate work in mathematics under adviser A.P. Calderon at the University of Chicago.

Awards and honors
 Salem Prize
 Sloan Fellow
 Fellow of the American Mathematical Society.

Selected publications

See also

Babenko–Beckner inequality
Hirschman uncertainty

References

External links
Beckner's home page

20th-century American mathematicians
21st-century American mathematicians
Living people
Princeton University alumni
University of Texas at Austin faculty
1941 births
Mathematical analysts
Fellows of the American Mathematical Society
Mathematicians from Missouri
Scientists from Missouri
University of Missouri physicists